The New Croton Aqueduct is an aqueduct in the New York City water supply system in Westchester County, New York carrying the water of the Croton Watershed.  Built roughly parallel to the Old Croton Aqueduct it originally augmented, the new system opened in 1890. The old aqueduct remained in service until 1955, when supply from the Delaware and Catskill Aqueducts was sufficient to take it off line.

Waters of the New Croton Aqueduct flow to the Jerome Park Reservoir in the Bronx before entering Croton Water Filtration Plant in Van Cortlandt Park for treatment, then out to distribution.

Overview
The Croton Watershed is one of three systems that provide water to New York City, joined by the waters of the Delaware and Catskill Aqueducts. The Croton system comprises 12 reservoirs and 3 controlled lakes.

History

The New Croton Aqueduct opened on July 15, 1890, replacing the Old Croton Aqueduct. Water flows then proceed toward the Croton Water Filtration Plant for treatment. Treated water is distributed to certain areas of the Bronx and Manhattan.

In the late 1990s, the city stopped using water from the Croton system due to numerous water quality issues. In 1997 the U.S. Environmental Protection Agency (EPA), the U.S. Department of Justice and the State of New York filed suit against the city for violating the Safe Drinking Water Act and the New York State Sanitary Code. The city government agreed to rehabilitate the New Croton Aqueduct and build a filtration plant. The filtration system protects the public from disease-causing microorganisms such as Giardia and Cryptosporidium. The Croton Water Filtration Plant was activated in May 2015.

See also
 New York City water supply system
 Water supply network

References

Aqueducts in New York (state)
Geography of the Bronx
Interbasin transfer
Transportation buildings and structures in Westchester County, New York
Water infrastructure of New York City